Nitaf (Natâf) was a small Palestinian Arab village in the Jerusalem Subdistrict. It was depopulated during the 1947–1948 Civil War in Mandatory Palestine on April 15, 1948, during the second stage of Operation Dani. It was located 17 km west of Jerusalem, just north of Bayt Thul.

History
In the 1922 census of Palestine,  conducted by the British Mandate authorities, Nataf had a population 16, all Muslims.   In the 1931 census it was counted with Qatanna, together they had 875 Muslim inhabitants,  in 233 houses.

In the 1945 statistics   it had a population of 40 Muslims, and the total land area was 1,401 dunams, according to an official land and population survey. Of the land, a total of 166 dunams were plantations and irrigable land and 158 were for cereals, while a total of 1,077 dunams were classified non-cultivable land.

Nitaf had a maqam for local sage known as al-Shaykh Mas'ud.

1948 and aftermath
The village was depopulated on 15 April 1948, during the 1948 Palestine war.

Following the war, the area was incorporated into the State of Israel. The village of Nataf, established in 1982, is located less than 1 km south of the village site. According to Walid Khalidi on land belonging to Bayt Thul, but other sources, including Davar say the land was bought from Abu Ghosh.

In 1992, the village site was described: "There is a large, deserted stone house on the site surrounded by old terraces. It is a one-storey house with an arched door and arched windows. Northwest of this house, at the bottom of a slope, stands another deserted house. Most of the village lands fell within the Demilitarized Zone that was delineated by the armistice agreement of 1949 between Israel and Jordan."

References

Bibliography

External links
Welcome To Nitaf
Nitaf, Zochrot
  Nitaf, Palestine Family.net
Survey of Western Palestine, Map 17:  IAA, Wikimedia commons 

Arab villages depopulated during the 1948 Arab–Israeli War
District of Jerusalem